Bibb is a masculine given name. Notable people with the name include:

 Bibb Falk (1899–1989), American Major League Baseball player
 Bibb Graves (1873–1942), American politician
 Bibb Latané (born 1937), American social psychologist

Masculine given names